Santa Barbara Sky FC is a planned American professional soccer team based in Santa Barbara, California. First announced in 2022, the team plans to play in USL League One beginning in 2024.

History 
On July 12, 2022, the United Soccer League announced that Peter Moore had been granted a USL League One expansion team in Santa Barbara, to start play in the 2024 season. The team plans to play its matches at La Playa Stadium on the campus of Santa Barbara City College.

References

External links 
 

Soccer clubs in California
Association football clubs established in 2022
2022 establishments in California
USL League One teams